KOI-8 (КОИ-8) is an 8-bit character set standardized in GOST 19768-74. It is an extension of KOI-7 which allows the use of the Latin alphabet along with the Russian alphabet, both the upper and lower case letters; however, the letter Ёё and the uppercase Ъ are missed, the latter to avoid conflicts with the delete character (both are added in most extensions, see KOI8-B). The first 127 code points are identical to ASCII with the exception of the dollar sign $ (code point 24hex) replaced by the universal currency sign ¤. The rows x8_ and x9_ (code points 128–159) might be filled with the additional control characters from EBCDIC (code points 32–63).

This standard has become the base for the later Internet standards such as KOI8-R, KOI8-U, KOI8-RU and all the other derivatives.

Unicode is preferred to KOI-8 and its variants or other Cyrillic encodings in modern applications, especially on the Internet, making UTF-8 the dominant encoding for web pages. (For further discussion of Unicode's complete coverage, of 436 Cyrillic letters/code points, including for Old Cyrillic, and how single-byte character encodings, such as Windows-1251 and KOI8 variants, cannot provide this, see Cyrillic script in Unicode.)

Character set 
The following table shows the KOI-8 encoding. Each character is shown with its equivalent Unicode code point.

See also 
 KOI character encodings

Footnotes

References 

Character sets
Computing in the Soviet Union